Fallen is the debut studio album by American rock band Evanescence, released on March 4, 2003 by Wind-up Records. Co-founders singer and pianist Amy Lee and guitarist Ben Moody began writing and recording songs as Evanescence in 1995, and after releasing several EPs and a demo CD, Evanescence signed to Wind-up in January 2001. Several of the songs from their earlier independent releases feature on Fallen. The album was recorded between August and December 2002 in several studios in California. It is Evanescence's only studio album to feature Moody, who left the band in October 2003.

The album yielded four singles: "Bring Me to Life", "Going Under", "My Immortal", and "Everybody's Fool". "Bring Me to Life" and "My Immortal" charted in the top 10 of over 10 countries, including the US, UK and Australia. Fallen is the band's most commercially successful album to date, selling 10 million copies in the US and over 17 million copies worldwide, making it the sixth best-selling album of the 21st century. It debuted at number seven on the Billboard 200 with 141,000 copies sold in its first week, peaking at number three in June 2003. The album topped the charts in more than 10 countries. It was certified diamond by the Recording Industry Association of America (RIAA) in November 2022.

Fallen received generally positive reviews from music critics. Evanescence received five nominations at the 46th Grammy Awards: Album of the Year, Best Rock Album, Best Rock Song, Best Hard Rock Performance, and Best New Artist, winning the latter two. At the following year's ceremony,  "My Immortal" was nominated for Best Pop Performance by a Duo or Group with Vocals. Evanescence embarked on their first headlining concert tour, the Fallen Tour, in 2003. A live album and concert DVD with behind the scenes footage was released in 2004, titled Anywhere but Home.

Background
Lee and Moody met as teenagers in Little Rock, Arkansas in 1994. She brought him a cassette tape of her playing guitar and singing a song she wrote, and they became musical collaborators, playing and working on music at Lee's home, and occasionally performing acoustic sets at book stores and coffee houses in the Little Rock area. Lee had a 16-track recorder that she and him would use alongside Pro Tools, "fake strings and choirs" on her keyboard, and layer sounds and beats for their early material, which they mixed and produced. "We were basically just putting it down to remember what we wanted", Lee said. Lee's musical vision for Evanescence was "the idea of combinations that were unlikely". She aimed to combine her different musical tastes, "bringing something from the cinematic and classical symphonic world and marrying it to metal, hard rock and alternative music." "There was all this music that was inspiring me. And Evanescence was the product of these two extremes combining". 

They recorded three independent EPs. Their early demos got them airplay on the local modern rock station in Little Rock, which helped them develop a local fanbase, allowing them to play a couple of bigger production shows a year and hire other musicians to perform other instruments live. Although they played with guest musicians, Evanescence remained a duo. "It was more because that's what we did and how we worked rather than not wanting any other input", Lee recalled; "The idea of a full band playing these songs was something that only came along later." Moody said that at the time Lee and him were focused on writing music over playing live shows, and they did not want to have a band join their writing process; "we just wanted it to be the two of us and so we'd play once or twice a year." In 2000, they recorded a demo CD, Origin, and signed with Wind-up Records in 2001. Origin and the earlier EPs contain demo versions of some of the songs that would later appear on Fallen. 

In a 2004 MTV interview, Moody said that he and Lee rarely wrote together, it was "maybe two or three times in eight years did we actually sit down and write together in the same room." Lee said that the creation of Fallen largely consisted of her and Moody writing music separately and then adding to each other's work, due to tension and significant creative differences between them. Lee's creative disagreements with Moody included his strict approach to songwriting and focus on commerciality; he would "always be corralling" her ideas, and wanting to push them in a more commercial, pop direction. She indicated that with Moody there was a "pressure of wanting to rule the world". "It was always a push and pull between us, for me", she said. "Fallen really is a lot of compromise. It definitely leaned toward what he wanted a lot of the time." Creative restrictions included instrumentation decisions such as her wanting to play organ on the record and Moody not wanting that. Moody conceded that they had different approaches, adding that Lee is "more creative" and "more educated musically", and he is "more commercial minded" and likes making "songs people can adhere to." In 2004, Lee expressed that the making of Fallen was stressful because "we had to remember [that] at least one big single had to be totally radio-friendly. And I'm really ready not to think that way."

Recording 
Fallen was recorded in California at Track Record Studios, NRG Recording Studios, Ocean Studios, and Conway Recording Studios, beginning at Ocean Studios in Burbank, where "Bring Me to Life" was recorded prior to full album production. Recorded and mixed from late August to early December 2002, the album was "built on overdubs" to supplement "the depth of production" that the music involves; "this type of record should be done to where it sounds larger than life", producer Dave Fortman said. 

Songs were recorded as demos before the recording sessions, and "My Immortal", "Imaginary", and "Whisper" were originally from Lee and Moody's earlier independent demo recordings. They had originally recorded "My Immortal" at the radio station where Lee's father worked after it was empty late at night; this recording, with demo vocals and a MIDI keyboard, is the version used on Fallen per the label's demand, to Lee's displeasure. She stated:  Lee later said she also dislikes it because she "sounds like a little kid" and the album version of the song does not use David Campbell's orchestration. When "My Immortal" became a single, Lee and Moody chose their preferred version of the song for radio and its music video.

Jay Baumgardner lent Moody his guitar gear, including Gibson Les Paul and Gibson SG guitars,  Marshall and Mesa Boogie amp heads with an old Mesa Boogie cabinet. Moody said, "It was an old cabinet that was tried-and-true on rock records. It was a no-brainer to use it. I know it was used on Papa Roach and, I think, Staind." The guitars on the album were recorded at Mad Dog Studios in Burbank. Fortman recorded the guitars through two different amps: Marshall on one side and Mesa/Boogie on the other. "The differences tonally and with the different frequencies in the two different amps really do create a larger stereo feel", he said. He used two Shure 57 mics and ran them through Neve 1081 preamps directly to Pro Tools.

Lee's vocals, recorded on a Neumann U47 tube mic, pianos and the background vocals by the Millennium Choir were recorded at NRG Recording Studios. The orchestral parts were arranged by David Campbell and David Hodges except for "My Immortal", which was arranged by composer Graeme Revell. A 22-piece string section was recorded in Seattle, and later mixed at the Newman Scoring Stage and Bolero Studios in Los Angeles. To record the 12-member Millennium Choir's voices, Fortman ran a stereo pair of U67s and their voices were then doubled or tripled for a larger sound. In the bridge of "Imaginary", Fortman said "there are probably 70-plus people performing at that moment", including "the choir that's been doubled, a string orchestra with 22 players doubled, then you add all of the bandmembers, and it's huge."

Drum tracks were recorded at Ocean Studios, with Josh Freese playing on selected songs to a click track, stereo guitars and vocals. Fortman recorded Fresse's drums with C12As for overheads, Audio-Technica ATM25s on the toms, a D112 on the inside of the kick drum, a U47 on the outside, and an NS-10 speaker as an outside mic. He also used 414 microphones on the ride and hi-hat cymbals. He recorded the drums on two-inch tape on a Studer recorder, and bounced the tracks in Pro Tools. 

Fallen was mixed over a two-week period at Conway Recording Studios in North Hollywood, and mastered by Ted Jensen at Sterling Sound in New York City.

Regarding Hodges' involvement in Fallen and his exit from Evanescence thereafter, Moody stated:

Writing and musical style

Lee said that she generally writes songs alone first on the piano or on acoustic guitar, and for Fallen she would write a song and work with Moody to "take it to the finish line." Lee and Moody had composed some of the songs on Fallen when they were 15 and 16. Lee also wrote the choir parts on the album, and is credited with the choral arrangements. 

Most of Lee's writing on Fallen was driven by her mindset during an abusive relationship she was in. "Going Under", the first song on the album and its second single, Lee wrote about "coming out of a bad relationship". She described the feeling as, "when you're at the end of your rope, when you're at the point where you realize something has to change, that you can't go on living in the situation that you're in." Lee later said that after completing the songs that came out of an abusive relationship, she was listening to her words on "Going Under" and felt that in the chorus she would have liked to have written instead the notion of "I'm leaving and I'm not going to put up with this anymore", thinking to herself "you know what you need to do and you're not doing it." Billboard said that the "stop/start cadence" of the guitar, "rippling piano and Lee's defiant wail pack a startling wallop". 

Written by Lee when she was 19, "Bring Me to Life" is stylistically on the album a nu metal-rap rock song, which Lee disliked as the label forced them to add the male rapping vocal. She wrote the song after a then-acquaintance asked her if she was happy, and while in an abusive relationship at the time, she lied in response. The acquaintance seeing through her facade, as she felt she "was completely outwardly acting normal", inspired her to write the track. 
The song is about "open-mindedness" and "waking up to all the things you've been missing for so long", Lee said, realizing that "for months I'd been numb, just going through the motions of life." She later confirmed that the acquaintance was Josh Hartzler, a therapist who became a close friend and she married in 2007.  "From the sparkling piano to the epic choruses, to Lee's siren call", Billboard considered "Bring Me to Life" Fallens "definitive track."  

Lee wrote "Everybody's Fool", the album's fourth single, in 1999 about the lie of pop stardom life and unrealistic, over-sexualized images that warped the youth's expectations. In a VH1 interview, Lee explained how the song came about: "My little sister was really getting into these, I don't want to offend anyone, but like really fake, cheesy, slutty female cracker-box idols, and it really pissed me off. She started dressing like them and she was like 8 years old. So I gave her the talk and I wrote a song." She said it is not about a specific person, but about a collective of the industry that promotes detrimental images and ideals of perfection while "nobody looks like that. It's all fake and it's really hurting a lot of girls' and women's self images." Songfacts stated that the song's concept "seems like it's always relevant". When asked about it in 2016, Lee said she wrote it as "an angsty teenager" about her "frustration with fakeness" that sprung at the time from all the "bubblegum pop acts" that were "put together like products" influencing young people, including her younger siblings. She added:  Lee further said that she also acknowledged that "you never know what's going on inside anybody, no matter what they seem like", and that it is a song she has "disconnected" from over the years.
 
"My Immortal" is a piano power ballad, with fictional words written by Moody and the composition worked on by Moody and Lee when they were 16 and 15, respectively. The version on the album was the preferred version of the label, a demo using all keyboard and Lee's demo vocals from when she originally recorded it as a teen, alongside added strings; while the single version used for radio and the music video features a full band performance after the bridge and a new string arrangement. 

"Haunted"'s production emphasizes "feeling overwhelmed by someone’s obsession with you", according to Billboard, with Lee "fighting both being possessed and her desire to give in to it." "Tourniquet" is a reworked cover of Soul Embraced's "My Tourniquet", co-written by Soul Embraced guitarist and Evanescence tour drummer Rocky Gray. Gray told Lee the song was "coming from a Christian standpoint, but it's about suicide. It's from the perspective of someone who has just committed suicide and it's about the controversy in Christianity that if you commit suicide, will you go to heaven or hell?" Lee wrote the cover's melody and added the second verse.

"Imaginary" is a song from Evanescence's 1998 self-titled EP, which Lee wanted as Fallen fourth single. She had written it about feeling the need to retreat to her safe haven as a young teen. Billboard described the combination of Lee's lyrics, the piano, "crashing drums" and the Millennial Choir as painting "a picture of the heavens shooting overhead". The midtempo "Taking Over Mes lyrics are about Lee being consumed by another person's obsession with her. 

Lee wrote "Hello" about her little sister who died of an illness when Lee was six years old. The song has a "chilled atmosphere", Billboard stated, and "relates, from a child’s perspective, the dawning agony of realizing someone is gone forever." The lyrics of "My Last Breath" imply a struggle for emotional and physical survival. Driven by guitar and Lee's "commanding voice", "Whisper" features the "booming" Millennium Choir singing in Latin, ending the album "on a foreboding note", Billboard wrote. 

Fallen was regarded as nu metal, gothic rock, gothic metal, and alternative metal.

Release and tour

 
"Bring Me to Life" first appeared in a scene of the film Daredevil and was included on the film's soundtrack, released in February 2003. Fallen was released on March 4, 2003.

Fallen was initially promoted by the label in the Christian market. Lee and Moody publicly made it clear in an April 2003 interview that they were not a Christian band and did not want to be associated with Christian rock. Moody's comments against being in the Christian market immediately prompted Wind-up Records chairman Alan Meltzer to send a letter to Christian radio and retail outlets explaining that despite the "spiritual underpinning that ignited interest and excitement in the Christian religious community", Evanescence were "a secular band, and as such view their music as entertainment" and the label then "strongly feels that they no longer belong in Christian retail outlets." Wind-up formally requested the recall of Fallen from Christian retailers and radio stations. After receiving the letter, many Christian radio stations pulled Fallen songs from their playlists.

Rolling Stone stated in April 2003 that while Wind-up had no official Christian affiliation, they had been marketing their bands "to both the Christian and mainstream music market." Wind-Up "began courting the Christian music market more than a year ago, making its first foray with 12 Stones' self-titled 2002 debut. Hooking up with powerhouse Christian music distributor Provident ... Wind-Up attempted to tap into a segment that generated sales of more than 50 million albums in 2002". Terry Hemmings, CEO of Provident, said that the decision to recall Evanescence's album likely would not hurt Wind-up's image in the Christian market, and that he was puzzled by the band's about-face, saying: "They clearly understood the album would be sold in these  channels." Meltzer claimed their decision to promote Evanescence in the Christian market was made with the band's consent. Lee said that she had always opposed the promotion in the Christian market and the "Christian band" identification from the beginning, while Moody had supported it. Moody had misrepresented Evanescence in the past, talking about his religious beliefs as Evanescence's. The label had wanted to use the Christian market promotion as a marketing tool for the band, which she had opposed, stating that "it was an important fight to me because it felt false. That wasn't really what our music was. And I felt like they were selling somebody something that wasn't true." She noted that Evanescence "has never been a Christian band" and lyrically never had a religious affiliation.

On April 7, 2003, "Bring Me to Life" was released as the album's first single. Wind-up Records president Ed Vetri revealed that when the label introduced the song to radio, radio programmers rejected it, saying, "A chick and a piano? Are you kidding? On rock radio?" A female voice on rock radio was a rarity, and the song was considered for airplay only after there was a male vocal on it. After the song was released on the Daredevil soundtrack, a grassroots fanbase grew and listeners began requesting air play for it, compelling radio stations to reconsider the band. On the worldwide success of the song, Lee said: 

After the album's completion, Evanescence's touring lineup was hired, including guitarist John LeCompt, drummer Rocky Gray, and bassist Will Boyd. Evanescence performed on radio shows and on the festival circuit for weeks in early 2003. They embarked on their first headlining tour from April to May in the US. In June, they had to cancel shows in Germany due to Moody reportedly falling ill. That month, they accepted an offer from the video game company Nintendo to perform on the Nintendo Fusion Tour, which they headlined beginning on August 4, 2003. In an August 2003 interview, Moody said that Evanescence is "just Amy and I, and I want to keep it that way", adding that their process together is what works.

Moody left the band mid-tour in October 2003. Guitarist Terry Balsamo replaced him on tour and as Evanescence's lead guitarist. The band played some shows with Korn in Europe, with Evanescence originally set to headline however Lee wanted Korn to headline instead. Evanescence filmed a Paris concert of the Fallen tour for their first live album and concert DVD, Anywhere but Home (2004).

Critical reception

Fallen received generally positive reviews from music critics. Johnny Loftus of AllMusic wrote that the album “does include flashes of the single's PG-rated nu-metal ('Everybody's Fool,' 'Going Under'). But it's the symphonic goth rock of groups like Type O Negative that influences most of Fallen." Entertainment Weekly, graded the album B-minus: "The genre now too old to be called nü-metal isn't exactly overflowing with spine-tinglingly great vocalists – let alone female ones. Amy Lee, lead singer of gloomy Arkansas rockers Evanescence, is an exception." Kirk Miller of Rolling Stone said that "when vocalist Amy Lee croons about lying 'in my field of paper flowers' or 'pouring crimson regret,' she gives Fallen a creepy spiritual tinge that the new-metal boys lack."

Billboards Christa Titus called the album a "highly polished, hook-filled affair." Melissa Maerz of Spin gave it four out of five stars: "Nu metal gets a powdering of Andrew Lloyd Webber theatrics as Lee aces her piano A-levels, adds a string section, and tackles capital letter issues – God ('Tourniquet'), Love ('Going Under'), and Death ('Bring Me To Life') – with the grandeur they deserve." Adrien Begrand of PopMatters opined that the album "has a small handful of transcendent moments, but a complete lack of musical adventurousness has the band mucking around either in stultifying nu-metal riffage, pretentious high school journal caterwauling, or even worse, both." Begrand praised Lee's "soaring, enchanting, angelic" voice, writing that "Evanescence would be nothing" without her. Christopher Gray of the Austin Chronicle found the album to be "a little too by the numbers to fully capitalize on Lee's obvious talents." According to Village Voice critic Robert Christgau, "Their faith, as embodied in Amy Lee's clarion sopralto , lends their goth-metal a palpable sweetness". He jokingly concluded, "Now if only it wasn't goth-metal at all." In 2017, Rolling Stone ranked Fallen number 99 on their list of "The 100 Greatest Metal Albums of All Time", calling it an "unlikely classic" with "a horror-movie-level ambience that was as chilling as it was campy".

Commercial performance
Fallen has sold more than 17 million units worldwide, with 10 million in the US, since its 2003 release. The album debuted at number seven on the Billboard 200, with more than 141,000 copies sold in its first week, Fallen was the eighth-bestselling album of 2004 and the nineteenth-bestselling album of the 2000s. By October 2011 the album had spent 106 weeks on the Billboard 200, with 58 of those weeks in the top 20. Peaking at number three on June 14, 2003, it re-entered the chart at number 192 on March 13, 2010. Fallen spent 223 weeks on the Top Pop Catalog Albums chart after it fell off the Billboard 200. The Recording Industry Association of America (RIAA) certified the album platinum in April 2003 and 4x platinum in January 2004; in November 2022, it was certified diamond for 10 million units sold in the US.

On the UK Albums Chart, Fallen debuted at number 18 with sales of 15,589 copies. The album reached number one (with 38,570 copies sold) seven weeks later, after "Bring Me to Life" topped the UK Singles Chart. It sold 56,193 copies in December 2003, its highest week of sales (although it was number 28 on the chart that week). Fallen spent 33 weeks in the top 20 and 60 weeks in the top 75. It re-entered the UK chart at number 35 the week after the release of Evanescence's second studio album, The Open Door. Fallen also topped the charts in more than ten other countries and reached the top ten in over 20 countries. According to Nielsen SoundScan figures, after more than three months in the top 10 of the Canadian Albums Chart Fallen peaked at number one on August 13, 2003 with sales of 8,900 copies.

Track listing

Personnel
Credits adapted from the liner notes of Fallen.

Evanescence
 Amy Lee – vocals, choral arrangements, piano, keyboards
 Ben Moody – guitars, tribal percussion, programming
 David Hodges – piano, keyboards, additional programming; string arrangements 

Additional musicians
 Francesco DiCosmo – bass
 Josh Freese – drums
 David Campbell – string arrangements 
 Graeme Revell – string arrangements 
 Zac Baird – additional programming
 Chris Johnson – additional programming
 Millenium choir – background choir: Beverly Allen, Geri Allen, Eric Castro, Melanie Jackson, Karen Matranga, Joanne Paratore, Lesley Paton, Dwight Stone, Rick Stubbs, Talaya Trigueros, Susan Youngblood 
 Paul McCoy – guest vocals 

Technical

 Dave Fortman – production ; mixing 
 Jay Baumgardner – mixing 
 Ben Moody – production ; additional Pro Tools engineering
 Jeremy Parker – engineering
 Ted Jensen – mastering
 Jason Cupp – engineering assistance
 Dean Nelson – engineering assistance
 Ai Fujisaki – engineering assistance
 Sergio Chavez – engineering assistance
 Sam Storey – engineering assistance
 Mark Curry – strings recording, strings mixing
 John Rodd – strings recording
 Bill Talbott – strings engineering

Artwork
 Ed Sherman – art direction
 Frank Veronsky – photography

Charts

Weekly charts

Monthly charts

Decade-end charts

Year-end charts

Certifications and sales

Release history

Notes

References

External links
 

2003 debut albums
Albums produced by Dave Fortman
Epic Records albums
Evanescence albums
Gothic metal albums by American artists
Wind-up Records albums